The Lambert equal-area conic projection (named after Johann Heinrich Lambert), is a conic, equal area map projection that represents one pole as a point. Albers projection is a generalization of this projection with two standard parallel. Lambert equal-area conic projection can be viewed as an extreme case of Albers projection or Lambert azimuthal equal-area projection.

See also

 List of map projections
 Lambert azimuthal equal-area projection
 Albers projection
 Lambert conformal conic projection

References

Map projections
Equal-area projections